Axel Springer SE is a European multinational digital and popular periodical publishing house which is the largest in Europe, with numerous multimedia news brands, such as Bild, Die Welt, and Fakt and more than 15,000 employees. It generated total revenues of about €3.3 billion and an EBITDA of €559 million in the financial year 2015. The digital media activities contribute more than 60% to its revenues and nearly 70% to its EBITDA. Axel Springer’s business is divided into three segments: paid models, marketing models, and classified ad models. Since 2020, it is majority-owned by the US private equity firm KKR. Headquartered in Berlin, Germany, the company is active in more than 40 countries, including subsidiaries, joint ventures, and licensing.

It was started in 1946/1947 by journalist Axel Springer. Its current CEO is Mathias Döpfner. The Axel Springer company is the largest publishing house in Europe and controls the largest share of the German market for daily newspapers; 23.6%, largely because its flagship tabloid Bild is the highest-circulation newspaper in Europe with a daily readership exceeding 12 million. Upon its acquisition of Politico and Business Insider, Axel Springer announced that all employees must support a free market economy, a united Europe, and Israel's right to exist.

Newspapers, magazines, online offerings 
The media offerings of Axel Springer SE are clustered in: current news, autos, sports, computers and consumer electronics, as well as lifestyle.

Selection of publications
 Die Welt, the intellectual flagship of the company
 Bild, tabloid with the largest circulation in Europe
 Auto Bild, automobile magazine with the largest circulation in Europe
 Audio Video Foto Bild, magazine for consumer electronics
 Computer Bild, published in nine countries, is Europe's best-selling computer magazine
 Sport Bild, published in many countries, is Europe's largest sport magazine
 Auto.cz, the largest Czech internet car portal including RoadLook.tv, starting in Slovakia and Poland as well
 Fakt, the largest daily tabloid in Poland
 B.Z., local newspaper
 Watchmi, a personalized TV content discovery system
 Musikexpress, a monthly music magazine
 the German edition of the magazine Rolling Stone
 Transfermarkt, a football statistics website
 Business Insider, a business, celebrity and technology news website
 Insider, a social media-based lifestyle publication
 upday, a news aggregator app
 Politico, acquired by Axel Springer in October 2021.
 Politico Europe, European political newspaper, joint venture with Politico
 Protocol, tech journalism publication acquired alongside Politico

In addition, the company is active in the online editorial and marketing business with its shares in aufeminin.com, Awin, and buy.at, and owns several online classified advertising platforms such as the career site StepStone [de], the real estate marketing portal immonet, various coupon portals, including Sparheld.de Germany and Reduc.fr in France and price comparison platform idealo. It is also a significant investor in the American digital media company Group Nine Media.

History

1940s 

In 1946, publisher Hinrich Springer (age 66) and his son Axel Springer (age 34) established the limited company Axel Springer Verlag GmbH. That year saw the launch of the Nordwestdeutsche Hefte and the radio and TV magazine Hörzu.

In 1948, the evening newspaper Hamburger Abendblatt was launched, the first daily newspaper created by Axel Springer.

1950s 

The year 1952 saw the launch of the popular daily newspaper Bild. The paper was based on the British tabloid Daily Mirror, and peaked at circulation of 5 million in the 1980s.

In 1953, Axel Springer Verlag bought the publishing house Die Welt, including the daily paper Die Welt and the Sunday paper Welt am Sonntag.

In 1956, the company headquarters in Hamburg was built.

Then in 1959, the company acquired the a holding in Ullstein AG, which owned Berlin newspapers Berliner Morgenpost and B.Z. and the Ullstein book-publishing business.

1960s 

The official opening of the Berlin headquarters took place in 1966. Hamburg remained an important site.

After the attack on the student leader Rudi Dutschke on 11 April 1968, the APO (Extra-Parliamentary Opposition) began acts of violence against the company. The APO had a history of animosity with the Springer Group's allegedly biased coverage of the student movement. For instance, in the wake of the shooting of Benno Ohnesorg by the police at a student demonstration against the Shah, one Springer paper reported that "what happened yesterday in Berlin had nothing to do with politics …. It was criminal in the most sickening way." In fact, Ohnesorg, who had never attended a demonstration before, had been shot in the back while trying to leave the demonstration.

1970s 
The years 1972 and 1973 saw the building of the offset-printing plant in Essen-Kettwig.

1980s 

1984 witnessed the official opening of the offset printing facility in Ahrensburg near Hamburg.

In 1985, 49% of the company was offered for public subscription. Later that year Axel Springer died. Control was passed to his widow Friede Springer.

In 1986, the first licensed edition of Auto Bild came out, in Italy. Other licensed editions and joint venture publications later appeared in twenty European countries, Indonesia and Thailand.

1990s 
In 1993, there was the official opening of the offset printing works in Berlin-Spandau.

In May 1999, Axel Springer bought a 51% majority stake in the American television production company GRB Entertainment, but was later divested in 2002.

2000-present 

In 2001, Axel Springer and T-Online established a joint subsidiary Bild.de/T-Online AG. A year later in 2002, the launch of immonet.de took place, and Mathias Doepfner, former editor-in-chief of Die Welt, became CEO of Axel Springer AG. Then in 2003, the name was changed to Axel Springer AG.

In 2009, Axel Springer AG acquired affiliate marketers Zanox and Digital Window as well as StepStone ASA. In 2010 a $635.7 million offer by Axel for leading French real estate website operator seloger.com caused seloger shares to rise as much as 32%, the most since it went public. Within 3 days Axel increased its offer 15.6% to $735 million after shareholders rejected the deal.

In 2012, Axel Springer formed a joint venture (Axel Springer Digital Classified) with global growth equity firm General Atlantic. The company also bought TotalJobs in the UK from Reed Elsevier that year.

In 2013, Springer sold its regional newspapers, women's magazines, and television magazines to Funke Mediengruppe for €920 million That same year, Publications Grand Public, a French magazine publisher owned by Springer, was sold to Reworld Media.

In 2015, Axel Springer AG purchased Business Insider, a business, celebrity and technology news website, in a deal that valued Business Insider at $442 million. On 8 December of the same year, Axel Springer increased its share in Axel Springer Digital Classifieds GmbH from 70 per cent to 85 per cent and was granted a purchase option to acquire the remaining 15 per cent from General Atlantic. On 9 December, Axel Springer exercised the option, acquiring the additional 15% from General Atlantic in exchange for shares of Axel Springer, leaving the growth equity firm with 8.3% holding in the company.

In 2020, Friede Springer transferred $1.5 billion of Axel Springer shares to CEO Mathias Doepfner, effectively making him heir of the media group. Doepfner now has control of 44% of the voting rights.
In October 2021, the firm announced that it had completed the acquisition of Politico for over $1 billion, after announcing its intention to do so in late August 2021. Axel Springer's Chief Executive Mathias Döpfner said that Politico staff would need to adhere to Axel Springer's principles, including support for a united Europe, "reconciliation between Germans and Jews," Israel’s right to exist and a free-market economy, and that staff who disagree with the principles "should not work for Axel Springer, very clearly".

In October 2021, an article in The New York Times reported accusations of sexual misconduct, sexual discrimination and questionable business practices at Axel Springer SE. A day later, the publisher fired the editor-in-chief of Bild.

Criticism

Pro-American editorial bias and alleged ties to US intelligence agencies 
According to German scholar Gudrun Kruip of the Stiftung Bundespräsident-Theodor-Heuss-Haus, Axel Springer SE and its subsidiaries spread a strongly pro-American view in which criticism of US foreign policy is largely absent. In an interview with The Nation, two former CIA officers alleged that Axel Springer received $7 million from the CIA to support American geopolitical interests with his publishing house. Springer reportedly agreed and began guiding the editorial bias towards supporting US foreign policy. Although no conclusive evidence has come to light, Kruip considers the CIA officers' allegations credible since Springer, according to his own autobiography, had no money to actually fund the publishing house when it was founded, and it was thus unlikely that he could finance its rapid ascent without "money from the outside". As of 2021, the Axel Springer SE names "solidarity with the libertarian values of the United States of America" as one of its core principles on its own website. Many scholars and independent observers allege a "subservience to American geopolitical interests" of the publishing house and its subsidiaries to this day. According to Foreign Policy, Axel Springer SE "has a decades-long record of bending journalistic ethics for right-wing causes."

Accusations of editorial interference in Poland 
In 2017, Ringer Axel Springer Polska was accused of editorial interference, when the head of the joint venture Mark Dekan wrote a letter to the company's Polish employees in which he disparaged the head of the conservative Law and Justice political party, calling the Polish politician Jaroslaw Kaczynski a "loser" for opposing the candidacy of Donald Tusk as President of the European Council, stating that "...we should never forget about the basic values that we represent... Here is the moment where free media, such as ours must be active. We speak for the ideas of... a United Europe." In the letter, Dekan also raised his concerns that European integration was least supported by the youngest generation of Poles and vowed to take appropriate action, suggesting "Let's tell them what to do to stay in the fast lane and not end in the parking lot."

Abuse of power and sexual harassment 
In March 2021, Der Spiegel reported accusations that the editor of Bild, Julian Reichelt, had promoted several young female employees in exchange for sex and sought to buy their silence before dismissing them. This was followed up by a similar report in the New York Times in October 2021. Both reported that Axel Springer had investigated and dismissed the complaints against Reichelt, and had proceeded to suppress reporting of the controversy by other outlets. CEO Mathias Doepfner was reportedly also keen to support Reichelt on account of the latter's strong right wing political leanings. Later the same month, Axel Springer reversed course and dismissed Reichelt.

Competitors 

Major competitors in the German publishing market include Bauer Media Group, Bertelsmann, Hubert Burda Media, and Holtzbrinck. On a global scale, some of the key competitors of Axel Springer include other large multinational media companies such as News Corporation, Time Warner, and The New York Times Company. These companies operate in a variety of different media sectors, including print, television, and digital, and are all major players in the global media industry. In addition to traditional media companies, Axel Springer also competes with a number of digital media platforms and companies, such as Google, Facebook, and Apple, which have become increasingly influential in the media industry in recent years. These companies have disrupted the traditional media business model by offering new ways for people to access news and information, and have posed a significant challenge to traditional media companies like Axel Springer.

See also
Media concentration
Protests of 1968

References

External links 

 

 
Pan-European media companies
Publishing companies established in 1946
Newspaper companies of Germany
Companies based in Berlin
1946 establishments in Germany